Kakuyuni is a settlement in Kenya's Malindi Coast Province.

References 

Populated places in Coast Province